Eyes in the Dark is a 2010 American horror film written and directed by Bjorn Anderson. It is filmed in the "found footage" style.

Plot

The movie follows seven college students as they take a weekend trip to a lodge in the Cascade Mountains. As they film themselves for their video blog, they record some strange occurrences. The students and the lodge's caretaker come across a mysterious cave with unusual markings. They soon become hunted by an unknown creature with glowing red eyes.

Cast

Production
The idea for the film came to director Bjorn Anderson in a nightmare. He was influenced by Cloverfield and The Blair Witch Project to shoot the movie in a similar first-person point-of-view style. Anderson first pitched the idea of the Eyes in the Dark to producers Joseph Cole and Mike Ash in 2007 while finishing their first film, Warrior's End. Principal photography was done during the summer of 2008, but additional scenes were filmed later.

Release
The film had its world premiere on April 25, 2010 at the Alabama International Film Festival. In 2010, it was also an official selection for Seattle's True Independent Film Festival, Fright Night Film Fest, Local Sightings, and Killer Film Fest. The movie was released on DVD through Amazon.com on March 21, 2011.

Reception 

Viewings of the trailer for Eyes in the Dark created curiosity for what the red eyes are. After attending an early, private screening, movie reviewer Jeff Walls said that he "enjoyed the film" and it "was edited together really well." Just before the DVD release, Reviewer Hal C. F. Astell describes the movie as "astounding" in comparison to big budget movies like Avatar. He goes on to say, "it's refreshing to see such a carefully crafted micro-budget film."

References

External links 
 
 
 Film director with Island ties premieres independent movie Mercer Island Reporter article

2010 films
2010 horror films
American monster movies
Found footage films
2010s English-language films
2010s American films